{{DISPLAYTITLE:1 52 honeycomb}}

In geometry, the 152 honeycomb is a uniform tessellation of 8-dimensional Euclidean space. It contains 142 and 151 facets, in a birectified 8-simplex vertex figure. It is the final figure in the 1k2 polytope family.

Construction

It is created by a Wythoff construction upon a set of 9 hyperplane mirrors in 8-dimensional space.

The facet information can be extracted from its Coxeter-Dynkin diagram.
 

Removing the node on the end of the 2-length branch leaves the 8-demicube, 151.
 

Removing the node on the end of the 5-length branch leaves the 142.
 

The vertex figure is determined by removing the ringed node and ringing the neighboring node. This makes the birectified 8-simplex, 052.

Related polytopes and honeycombs

See also 
 521 honeycomb
 251 honeycomb

References
 Coxeter The Beauty of Geometry: Twelve Essays, Dover Publications, 1999,  (Chapter 3: Wythoff's Construction for Uniform Polytopes)
 Coxeter Regular Polytopes (1963), Macmillan Company
 Regular Polytopes, Third edition, (1973), Dover edition,  (Chapter 5: The Kaleidoscope)
 Kaleidoscopes: Selected Writings of H.S.M. Coxeter, edited by F. Arthur Sherk, Peter McMullen, Anthony C. Thompson, Asia Ivic Weiss, Wiley-Interscience Publication, 1995,   GoogleBook
 (Paper 24) H.S.M. Coxeter, Regular and Semi-Regular Polytopes III, [Math. Zeit. 200 (1988) 3-45]

9-polytopes